Sanam Bewafa is a 1991 Indian Hindi-language film directed and produced by Saawan Kumar Tak, it stars Salman Khan, Chandni, Pran, Danny Denzongpa. It is a remake of the Pakistani film Haque Meher.

Plot 
 
The film is based on two Pathan Tribal families who have been feuding for many generations. Salman, Sher Khan's son, falls in love with Rukhsar, Fateh Khan's daughter.

On finding the truth, Fateh Khan finds his wrath too much to control. On the other hand, Sher Khan is extremely happy to know that his son is in love with his enemy's daughter and promises Salman that he shall get him married to Rukhsar. The marriage is settled after great difficulties.

On the day of the marriage ceremony, Fateh Khan places an incredible demand in Haque-Meher, Sher Khan is dumbfounded and shocked, but gives in for his son's happiness. Hurt by the insult, Sher Khan retaliates by throwing Rukhsar out of the house the following morning after the marriage, paying the agreed Haque-Meher (Daaj). On seeing Rukhsar back, her family is numb with shock.

This leads to conflicts between the two families resulting in bloodshed and loss of life on both sides, but Sher Khan and Fateh Khan remain adamant until they discover that Rukhsar is pregnant with Salman's Son. The newborn finally lead to peace between the two Families.

Cast 
Salman Khan as Salman Khan
Chandni as Rukhsar Khan
Pran as Fateh Khan
Danny Denzongpa as Sher Khan
Puneet Issar as Afzal Khan
Pankaj Dheer as Zuber Khan
Dina Pathak as Fateh's Mother
Jagdeep as Daroga
Kanchan as Kanchan
Vijayendra Ghatge as Sajjan Thakur
Gurbachan Singh as Jangi Khan
Dan Dhanoa as Shaukat Khan

Music 
The music was composed by Mahesh Kishor and lyrics were penned by Saawan Kumar himself. Singers Lata Mangeshkar, Vipin Sachdeva, Kavita Krishnamurthy contributed their voice. The songs were and had a flavor of 1970's music.  "Churi Maza Na Degi" &  "O Hare Dupatte Wali" were popular songs.

Box office
It was declared one of the biggest low budget "Blockbuster" By the reputed trade website Box Office India.

Awards
37th Filmfare Awards:
 Best Supporting Actor – Danny Denzongpa

References

External links 

1991 films
1990s Hindi-language films
Hindi films remade in other languages
Indian remakes of Pakistani films
Films directed by Saawan Kumar Tak